Central El Paso is part of the city of El Paso, Texas, and contains some of the city's oldest and most historic neighborhoods. Located in the heart of the city, it is home to approximately 130,000 people. Development of central El Paso started around 1875, when the city was barely beginning to gain its roots.

Today, central El Paso has grown into the center of the city's economy and a thriving urban community. It contains numerous historic sites and landmarks. It is close to the El Paso International Airport, Downtown El Paso, the international border, and Fort Bliss.

History 
The central El Paso area includes some of the earliest developed areas in the city. In September 1827, Juan Maria Ponce de Leon bought 211 acres of land where El Paso and Paisano streets are today.

Neighborhoods 

 Altura Park
 Austin Terrace
 Chihuahuita
 Clardy Fox
 Cotton Place
 Downtown El Paso
 El Segundo Barrio
 Government Hill
 Highland Park
 Loretto Place
 Magoffin Historic District
 Manhattan Heights
 Sambrano
 South central El Paso

References

Footnotes

Sources 
 

Geography of El Paso, Texas